Cannalonga is a town and comune in the Province of Salerno, Campania, southern Italy.

History 
The town was founded between the 9th/10th century AD.

It became well known in the region around 1450, when the tradition of the festival called  Fiera di Santa Lucia started. Today this festival is better known as Fiera della Frecagnola.

The most popular historical monument there is the "Palazzo Ducale" (the duke's palace), which is located in the heart of the town, facing Piazza del Popolo. The palace belongs to the Dukes of Cannalonga, the Mogrovejo-Romano family.

Etymology 
According to some people, this name is due to the large number of bamboo-stems (it:canne di bambù) present in the area.
According to others the name is referred to an old measure unit called "canna".

Cuisine 
Traditional meals include:
Laane e ciciari (large tagliatelle and chickpeas)
Fusilli al sugo di castrato (local pasta with tomato sauce and castrated lamb meat)
Tiano (Easter 'poor man' meal based on pastry with sweetcorn, milk and cheese)
Pizza chiena (Easter pie based on rice, eggs, cheese and salami)
Bollito di capra (boiled goat meat based on an old, traditional recipe. Served as a speciality during the festival 'Fiera della Frecagnola')

Special events 
March 23: Celebration for Turibius of Mongrovejo
July: Sagra del Fusillo
July 16: Celebration for Madonna del Carmine.
2nd Saturday of September: Fiera della Frecagnola

See also
Cilento
Pruno Cilento

External links

Comune of Cannalonga
Feast of Our Lady of Mount Carmel

Cities and towns in Campania
Localities of Cilento